Black bag may refer to:

 Black Bag (character), a bin bag character from Viz comic strips, drawn by Graham Murdoch
 The Black Bag, a 1922 American lost silent film
 Black bag operation, an espionage technique
 Black-bag cryptanalysis, stealing of cryptographic secrets